The Danforth Campus is the main campus at Washington University in St. Louis. Formerly known as the Hilltop Campus, it was officially dedicated as the Danforth Campus on September 17, 2006, in honor of William H. Danforth, the 13th Chancellor of the University, the Danforth family and the Danforth Foundation. Distinguished by its collegiate gothic architecture, the  campus lies at the western boundary of Forest Park, partially in the City of St. Louis. Most of the campus (including almost all academic and administrative buildings) is in a small enclave of unincorporated St. Louis County, while all the campus area south of Forsyth Boulevard (mostly student housing) is in suburban Clayton. Immediately to the north across Forest Park Parkway is University City.

History

The construction of Danforth Campus was accelerated through a profitable lease of several buildings to the 1904 St. Louis World's Fair. During the fair, Brookings Hall, Busch Hall, Cupples I & II Halls, Francis Field & Gymnasium (site of the 1904 Summer Olympics), Ridgley Hall, Eads Hall, and Prince Hall (a men's dormitory) were used as administrative and exhibition spaces. At the fair's conclusion, the newly constructed buildings assumed their original functions as classrooms and administrative offices. Additionally, Francis Field and Gymnasium were converted for use by the Washington University athletic department.

The landscape design of the Danforth Campus was created in 1895 by Olmsted, Olmsted & Eliot, a firm best-known for designing New York City's Central Park. In 1899, after holding a national design competition, Washington University's administrators selected the Philadelphia firm Cope & Stewardson to design the entire campus. Cope & Stewardson, a firm known for its mastery of Collegiate Gothic, designed Brookings Hall as a centerpiece of a new campus plan. The plan, modeled after the distinctive quadrangles of Oxford and Cambridge Universities, has guided the construction and expansion of the Danforth Campus to the present day.

A large portion of the Danforth Campus is recognized as the Washington University Hilltop Campus Historic District, which achieved National Historic Landmark status in 1987.

In 2019, a $360 million renovation project, called the "East End Transformation", was unveiled on the Danforth Campus, building on the original 1895 campus plan by Olmsted, Olmsted & Eliot. The project included the creation of the Gary M. Sumers Welcome Center, which now houses undergraduate admissions; the Craig and Nancy Schnuck Pavilion, which houses a café, the Environmental Studies program, and the Office of Sustainability; the Henry A. and Elvira H. Jubel Hall, which houses the Department of Mechanical Engineering & Materials Science in the McKelvey School of Engineering; and the James M. McKelvey, Sr. Hall, which will be completed in 2020 and open in 2021 and will house the McKelvey School of Engineering's Department of Computer Science & Engineering. All new buildings on the east end have been designed to achieve LEED-Gold certification and include solar panels on many of the roofs to generate renewable electricity. In addition to the five new buildings, the project relocated six acres of parking lots underground, renovated and expanded the Mildred Lane Kemper Art Museum, and created the Ann and Andrew Tisch Park.

Campus buildings
Most of the buildings built between 1902 and the 1950s were designed by Cope & Stewardson and Jamieson and Spearl. James P. Jamieson was the chief architect for those built before 1940.

Arts and Sciences
Adolphus Busch Hall – Named for Adolphus Busch, co-founder of Anheuser-Busch, the building was the first to go under construction on the Danforth Campus, its cornerstone being laid in 1900. Busch Hall served as the Chemistry Building from 1902 until 1950. It was then remodeled into a humanities building, which it currently serves as today. Busch Hall was recently renovated and reopened June 15, 2009.

Beaumont Pavilion – An outdoor stage that sits in front of Cupples I. It was built in 1965 and named after Louis D. Beaumont. The stage is used for annual commencement ceremonies, the semesterly W.I.L.D. concert, and other outdoor theater productions and concerts.
Brookings Hall – The hallmark of Washington University. Named after Robert S. Brookings, it was completed in 1902 and served as the administrative center for the 1904 World's Fair. Today, it serves as the University's administrative center. South Brookings houses the Admissions Office and the Administrative offices for the College of Arts and Sciences. North Brookings houses the office of Student Financial Services, the office of the Chancellor, and the graduate school of Arts and Sciences.
Busch Laboratory – Completed in 1959, the lab was built as an extension of Rebstock Hall. It is only  and three stories high, helping to house the Biology Department.
Compton Laboratory of Physics – A , 5 level structure, the Compton Lab was dedicated in 1966. It houses the Department of Physics and the Physics Library.
Crow Hall – Dedicated in 1934, it is named for Wayman Crow, a founding member of the University. The building is not subject to the Earth's natural vibrations and contains a shaft that expands the full height of the building. It also houses the Department of physics and the historic Crow Observatory.
Cupples I Hall – This is the first building donated to the University by Samuel Cupples, in 1900. It currently houses the Math Department.
Duncker Hall – Dedicated in 1923, Duncker Hall housed the School of Commerce and Finance. It is one of the three buildings to have housed the School of Business for over three years (Prince Hall and Simon Hall are the other two). Duncker Hall now houses the English Department.
Eads Hall – This building was the site of the experimental work that Arthur Holly Compton conducted to win the Nobel Prize in 1927. It went through an extensive renovation in 1998 and today houses the Arts and Sciences Computing Center, the Language and Instructional Media Center, the Teaching Center, and the Writing Center.
Earth and Planetary Sciences Building – Dedicated in 2004, this building is the new home of the Earth and Planetary Sciences Department.
Eliot Hall – A concrete building that was dedicated in April 1974. Eliot Hall houses the Departments of History and Religious Studies, along with the Richard A. Gephardt Institute for Public Service.

Goldfarb Plant Growth Facility – Completed in 1988, the facility expands the Biology Department. It contains offices and lab space for biology students and professors, as well as a fully equipped greenhouse for experimental plant growth and research.
January Hall – Completed in the mid-1920s, January housed the School of Law until the early 70s. It contains an elegant wooden-paneled room which serves as the East Asian Library. Today, January houses the Department of Classics, the Office of the University College, the Religious Studies Committee, and the Arts and Sciences Summer School Office.
Life Sciences Building – Another addition to Rebstock Hall. The building was completed in the mid-1970s and houses the Biology Library and the Natural Science Learning Center.
Louderman Hall – Louderman Hall was built in the early 1950s to meet the University's needs to support newer research in atomic sciences. Louderman Hall houses the Department of Chemistry as well as the Chemistry Library.
McDonnell Hall – Dedicated in 1993, McDonnell Hall contains a 150-seat auditorium, and 75 and 85 seat classrooms. It also provides lab and research space for the Departments of Biology, and Earth and Planetary Sciences. The Environmental Studies Program is also housed inside of McDonnell Hall.
McMillan Hall – Dedicated in 1906, McMillan was the first women's dormitory on the Danforth Campus. In the early 1960s, McMillan Hall was remodeled into an academic building. It now houses the Department of Anthropology, the Committee on Social Thought and Analysis, the Department of Education, and the program of African and African American studies.
McMillan Laboratory – Completed in 1964, this building also houses the Department of Chemistry. It is connected to Prince Hall by Millstone Lounge.

Monsanto Laboratory – This lab also houses the Department of Biology.
Psychology Building – Designed by Skidmore, Owings & Merrill, the Psychology Building was completed in 1994, and has yet to be dedicated. Its facade was modeled after the main facade of Brookings Hall. In the summer of 2006, the Psychology Building was extended to include other classroom and office space. It houses the Department of Psychology and the Linguistic Studies Program.
Rebstock Hall – Dedicated in 1927, this building serves as the central home of the Biology Department.
Ridgley Hall – This served as the University's first library building until the early 1960s. During the 1904 World's Fair, Ridgley housed an exhibit of Queen Victoria's Diamond Jubilee gifts. The former library reading room was transformed into an ornate lounge space, which today is known as Holmes Lounge. Ridgley Hall is also the home of several language departments, the Committee on Comparative Literature and the Language Lab.
Seigle Hall – Completed and dedicated in 2008, Seigle Hall is an interdisciplinary endeavor, providing physical space for research centers and institutes, the Departments of Economics, Education, and Political Science, and the School of Law. With 15 classrooms, it is the largest academic classroom building on campus.
Wilson Hall – This structure was built in 1925 with a mineralogy lab, a petrology lab, and a testing lab for the study of Geology and Geography. The structure was expanded in 1976. It was renovated in the summer of 2006 and now houses the Philosophy Department and a portion of the Biology Department.
Wrighton Hall (formerly Laboratory Sciences Building) – Dedicated in 2002, this building provides additional lab space for teaching and research for the Chemistry Department. It also features a large 300-seat auditorium. The building was renamed in 2019 in honor of Washington University Chancellor Mark S. Wrighton.

Sam Fox School of Design and Visual Arts
Bixby Hall – Houses the School of Art
Givens Hall – Constructed in the 1930s, Givens Hall continues to house the school of Architecture and the Urban Research and Design Center
Mildred Lane Kemper Art Museum – Completed in 2006, this structure now houses the University's art museum facilities designed by Pritzker Prize-winning architect, and former faculty member, Fumihiko Maki. The art museum was first established in 1881 and was the first art museum west of the Mississippi River.
Steinberg Hall – Designed by Fumihiko Maki and completed as his first commission in 1960, Steinberg Hall houses the Art and Architecture Library and the Department of Art History and Archeology. Steinberg Hall was renovated in the fall of 2006.
Walker Hall – Also houses the School of Art

Olin Business School

Simon Hall – Simon Hall was dedicated in 1986. With  of usable floor space, it is one of the largest academic buildings on the Danforth Campus. Simon Hall houses the Business Library, the Art and Marge McWilliams Computing Center, and the School of Business.
Charles F. Knight Executive Education & Conference Center – This center was dedicated in 2001. It is a residential living and learning facility for the Olin Business School. It contains classrooms, conference rooms, lounges, 66 guest hotel rooms, a 225-seat dining area, administrative offices, a boardroom, a fitness center, and a pub. It houses all Executive Education programs and the Weston Career Resources Center.
In 2014, construction was completed on an expansion of the Olin Business School facilities. With a combined donation of $25 million, Knight Hall and Bauer Hall were constructed. The two buildings are joined by a three-story-high atrium and include spaces for lectures, faculty offices, and classrooms. The café at Bauer Hall includes the only on-campus Starbucks.

James McKelvey School of Engineering
Bryan Hall – Dedicated in 1970, this building contains office and lab space for engineering students and faculty. It houses the Computer and Communications Research Center, the Department of Computer Science and Engineering, and the Department of Electrical and Systems Engineering. Bryan Hall stands on the site of the Cupples Engineering Building, an engineering lab which was one of the ten original buildings on campus, demolished in 1967.
Cupples II Hall – The oldest of the engineering buildings, its cornerstone was laid in 1901. Cupples II was the first building to be built outside of the Brookings Quadrangle. It was used as the Jefferson Guard Building during the 1904 World's Fair. It is connected to Bryan Hall by a bridge.
Jolley Hall – Dedicated in 1990, Jolley houses the Department of Mechanical and Aerospace Engineering as well as departments housed in Bryan Hall. The building is connected to Bryan Hall.
Lopata Hall – Lopata is the main entrance to the engineering complex. It is a link between Sever, Cupples II, and Urbauer Halls. Lopata has a unique four-story gallery.
Sever Institute of Technology – Sever houses the graduate division of the School of Engineering. It also houses the Center for Engineering Computing (CEC).
Urbauer Hall – Dedicated in 1965, Urbauer contains lab space for the School of Engineering and Applied Sciences. Housed inside are the Departments of Chemical Engineering, Mechanical, and Aerospace Engineering and the Center for Computational Mechanics. Urbauer Hall also formerly housed the Department of Civil Engineering, which admitted its final first-year undergraduate class in fall 2008.
Whitaker Hall – Dedicated in 2003, this building houses the rapidly growing Department of Biomedical Engineering. There are also student and faculty lounges, along with several classrooms and office pods, containing conference rooms and staff support areas.

School of Law
Anheuser-Busch Hall – Dedicated in 1997, this  structure is the home of the University's Law School. The Law School was previously housed in Mudd Hall (which was torn down to make room for the Knight Center). The hall contains a café and a reference library.

George Warren Brown School of Social Work
Brown Hall – Dedicated in 1937, Brown Hall contains a 500-seat auditorium. It houses a portion of the School of Social Work and the Social Work Library.
Goldfarb Hall – Dedicated in 1998, Goldfarb Hall is the latest addition to the School of Social Work. It is connected to Brown Hall, doubling the space currently available to the school.

Student centers

Bowles Plaza – A large, open space located between Mallinckrodt and Umrath Hall. It contains amphitheater-style seating and a patio.
Danforth University Center (DUC) – Completed in 2008, it occupies the space where Prince Hall once stood and is the main student center on campus. The three-story, 116,000sqft building features dining areas, lounges, meeting rooms, and offices for student leaders and student services professional staff. Housed in the DUC is the Career Center, the Student Union student government, Student Life newspaper, WUTV, a recording studio for KWUR, the Graduate Center, and other on-campus groups. Underneath is a three-story underground parking garage. The building is expected to attain a LEED rating of Gold, the highest LEED rating of any current building on campus.

Graham Chapel – Dedicated in 1909, the chapel is used for concerts, plays, and the University's weekly lecture program, the Assembly Series. The chapel is modeled after King's College Chapel at Cambridge University though it differs markedly in scale. In its early history, many inaccurately and publicly boasted that Graham was an exact copy of King's Chapel. Attempting to discredit this comparison, the supervising architect Jamieson writes in his Intimate History of Washington University (1941): "The Graham Memorial Chapel is not a copy... the length and height of University Chapel are so modest, and so magnificent in King's that a comparison of the two seems idle."
Mallinckrodt Center – The central student center on the Danforth Campus. It houses the Campus Book Store, Computer Store, Dining Services, the Edison Theatre, the Division of Drama, the Division of Dance, and the Department of Performing Arts. WUTV is also housed inside.
Olin Library – Dedicated in 1962 and renovated in 2003, Olin Library is the largest library in Missouri. The library has several computing centers as well as a cyber café.
Umrath Hall – Begun as a men's dormitory, Umrath Hall now serves as a student center. It houses the Campus Y, a portion of the College of Arts and Sciences, Student Union, and the Career Center.
Women's Building – Opened in 1928, this building houses meeting spaces for sororities and other student groups. It is home to the Association of Black Students Lounge, the Office of Campus Life, the Office of Orientation, the Office of Student Activities, the KWUR Radio Station, Student Life, and Student Union.

Athletic facilities
Athletic Complex – Houses the Field House, Francis Gym, I.E. Millstone Swimming Pool, Interco Weight Room, McWilliams Fitness Center, Recreational Gym, and six Racquetball and two Squash courts.
Bushyhead Track – Surrounding historic Francis Field, an eight-lane 400-meter synthetic-surface track named for James Butler Bushyhead. Bushyhead Track, site of the 1904 Olympics and the 2004 Olympic Global Torch Relay, is the home of the Washington University men's and women's track and field teams. Built in 1902, Bushyhead Track featured a third-of-a-mile track that was used through the early 1980s.

Field House – Originally completed in 1926, the Field House was extensively remodeled to become an integral part of the updated athletic complex in 1985, and it now provides seating for 3,800 used during sports events. It is home to Washington University's men's and women's basketball and women's volleyball. It is also used for large events like commencement and convocation. The Field House hosted the first U.S Presidential debate of the 1992 campaign, the third and final debate of the 2000 presidential campaign, the second debate of the 2004 presidential campaign, and the Vice Presidential Debate in 2008.
Francis Field – Used during the 1904 Olympics. The field features a FieldTurf surface installed during the summer of 2004 4 light towers for the field as well as 2 light towers for the natural grass practice field located directly west of the field. Francis Field is home to Washington University's men's football and men's and women's soccer programs.
Francis Gymnasium – Finished in 1903, it was one of the buildings used in the 3rd modern Olympic Games, the first games held in the Western Hemisphere. They hosted the boxing and fencing events. The gymnasium portion of the building was demolished in 2015 to be replaced with a larger modern facility, with the campus-facing tower portion remaining in place.
I.E. Millstone Swimming Pool – Built in 1985, the eight-lane, 25-meter swimming pool is equipped with a diving well. Home to Washington University's men's and women's swimming and diving team, the I.E. Millstone Pool is also utilized for water aerobics classes, swim lessons and general lap swimming. I.E. Millstone received a B.S. in engineering and architecture in 1927 and an honorary degree in 1994. He became a member of the Washington University Board of Trustees in 1964. He had a successful construction company in St. Louis, and the company built some of the residence halls on the South 40. In 1970, the Millstone Lounge and Plaza were also named in his honor. This pool replaced the campus's original Wilson Pool building, constructed in 1923 east of where the Field House now stands, and demolished as part of the 1985 upgrades to the Athletic Center. 
Kelly Field – Home to Washington University's baseball team.
Recreational Gym – Features 3 basketball courts, a 1/10 mile track, and 2 batting cages for varsity baseball and softball practices.
Softball Field – Home to Washington University's softball team.
Tao Tennis Courts – The courts were resurfaced in 2006 with post-tension concrete and were painted to reflect the school colors, red and green. The six lighted courts are red with the outer boundaries being green. The courts serve as the on-campus home to Washington University's men's and women's tennis teams.

East Forsyth buildings

Alumni House – Built in 1911 as the private home of Robert S. Brookings, the building now houses the Office of Alumni and Development Programs.
Blewett Hall – Houses the Department of Music
Gaylord Music Library – Dedicated in 1960, this building houses the music library.
Harbison House – The residence of the Chancellor, also used for official University functions.
Music Classroom Building – Connected to Tietjens studio. Contains three classrooms and four studios for private music instruction.
Stix International House – Built in 1909, it houses the Office for International Students and Scholars.
Tietjens Memorial Music Studio – Contains 21 sound-proof practice rooms, a large area for band, choral, or orchestra practice and a recording studio.
Whittemore House – An elegant structure built in 1912, now used to house and dine special University guests.

Current construction
New research space for the Department of Biomedical Engineering, space for the International Center for Advanced Renewable Energy and Sustainability, a centralized location for the Department of Energy, Environmental, and Chemical Engineering, and new classroom space are among the facilities to be housed in the complex. The University has a goal of achieving Platinum LEED certification, the highest level of certification for environmental sustainability in new building construction. In April 2010, both Brauer Hall was dedicated and construction began on Preston M. Green Hall. Brauer Hall serves as the centerpiece to the new complex, while Green Hall features a prominent archway leading into the complex at the corner of two major thoroughfares in the area.
Redevelopment of the South 40 – Extensive plans are underway to replace the older dormitories on the South 40. When the entire project is completed, the area will be defined as a mixed-used facility consisting of dining locations, a small auditorium, fitness center, convenience store, lounges, storefronts for student-run businesses, and residences. The plan was modeled after a European streetscape in architecture and landscaping. In Summer of 2009, the Wohl Center was demolished to make way for the completed Phase 1 of the project, named South 40 House, containing upperclassmen dorms, a convenience store, the South 40 Fitness Center, and dining facilities. Umrath Hall was demolished in Summer 2008, and its replacement was finished in Fall 2009; the replacement Umrath Hall holds freshman residences. The current Rubelmann hall will be demolished, to make room for a replacement that will connect to Umrath Hall on all levels.
Construction of a new building for the Olin Business School: in the Summer of 2012, what is now Eliot Hall will be demolished to be replaced with a $90 million building for the Olin Business School. At over 160,000 square feet, the building will be a significant expansion to the facilities for the business school.

Campus art and sculpture
The Barry Flanagan bronze statue, "Thinker on a Rock", widely known, simply, as "The Bunny", is currently on permanent loan to Washington University and features prominently near Olin Library, Graham Chapel and Mallinckrodt (Edison Theater).

The Mildred Lane Kemper Art Museum on campus houses most of the University's art and sculpture collections, including pieces by Jackson Pollock, Robert Rauschenberg, Jenny Holzer, Pablo Picasso, Max Ernst, Willem de Kooning, Henri Matisse, Joan Miró, and Rembrandt van Rijn, among others.

References and notes

Image gallery

Washington University in St. Louis campus